Blake Powell (born 18 April 1991) is an Australian football (soccer) player who plays as a striker for APIA Leichhardt in the National Premier Leagues NSW.

Career

Sydney FC 
A member of Sydney FC National Youth League side over the 2010/11 and 2011/12 season as well as part of the Sydney FC Asian Champions League squad in 2011, Powell was rewarded with an A-League contract prior to the 2012/13 season.
He made his debut for Sydney FC on 13 October 2012 against Newcastle Jets; he scored his first goal on his debut in a 3–2 home loss.

Wellington Phoenix 
On 17 July 2015, Powell joined Wellington Phoenix.

On 14 February 2016, whilst playing against the Western Sydney Wanderers, Powell scored four goals, including a perfect hat-trick, in a single game in the A-League, the first Phoenix player to do so in the A-League.

On 5 July 2016, Wellington Phoenix released Powell from his contract for personal reasons, allowing him to return to Sydney and his family.

Central Coast Mariners 
In July 2016, after scoring a goal while trialling with the Central Coast Mariners, he signed a two-year deal. On 18 April 2018 Central Coast Mariners announced they wouldn't renew Powell's contract.

Ceres–Negros 
On 18 July 2018 Powell moved to Ceres–Negros F.C. in the Philippines Football League in the middle of the 2018 season.

References 

1991 births
Living people
Australian soccer players
Association football forwards
Bonnyrigg White Eagles FC players
Sydney FC players
APIA Leichhardt FC players
Wellington Phoenix FC players
Central Coast Mariners FC players
National Premier Leagues players
A-League Men players
New Zealand Football Championship players
Australian expatriate sportspeople in the Philippines
Expatriate footballers in the Philippines
Australian expatriate soccer players
Ceres–Negros F.C. players